August Kenneth Pye (August 21, 1931 – July 11, 1994) was the President of Southern Methodist University from 1987 to 1994.

Biography
August Kenneth Pye was born in New York City in 1931. He graduated from the University at Buffalo with a B.A., and later received J.D. and LL.M. degrees from Georgetown University.  While a student at Buffalo, he became a member of the Alpha Sigma Phi fraternity. 
He served as Dean of Duke Law School from 1968 to 1970 and from 1973 to 1976. He served as President of Southern Methodist University from 1987 to 1994, when he resigned for health issues. He died of cancer in 1994 in Lake City, Colorado.

References

|-

|-

1931 births
1994 deaths
Educators from New York City
People from Hinsdale County, Colorado
University at Buffalo alumni
Georgetown University alumni
Duke University people
Presidents of Southern Methodist University
Deaths from cancer in Colorado
20th-century American academics